Kranner's Fountain, or Kranner Fountain, is a fountain and neo-gothic monument to Emperor Francis I of Austria, installed in Prague, Czech Republic. It features allegorical sculptures created by Josef Max.

References

External links

 

Allegorical sculptures in the Czech Republic
Buildings and structures in Prague
Fountains in the Czech Republic
Gothic Revival architecture in the Czech Republic
Old Town (Prague)
Outdoor sculptures in Prague
Statues in Prague
Francis II, Holy Roman Emperor